The Latvian Women's Volleyball League is the most important Latvian women's volleyball competition organized by the Latvian Volleyball Federation (Latvijas Volejbola Federācija, LVF), it was established in 1992 just after the dissolution of the Soviet Union.

History
In the 2020/21 season 4 teams took part in the drawing of the national league: "Rigas VS" ( Riga ), "Jelgava" , RSU-MVS ( Riga ), "MiLATss" ( Daugavpils ). The champion's title was won by "Jelgava", which won the final series "Rigas VS" 2-1 (3: 1, 0: 3, 3: 2). 3rd place was taken by RSU-MVS.

List of Champions

References

External links
 Федерация волейбола Латвии
  Latvian League. women.volleybox.net 

Latvia
Volleyball in Latvia
Latvian Women's League
Sports leagues established in 1992
1992 establishments in Latvia
Sports leagues in Latvia